Johanna Tuomainen (unknown – unknown) was a Finnish chess player, Finnish Women Chess Championship winner (1974).

Biography
In the 1970s, Johanna Tuomainen was one of Finland's leading chess players. In Finnish Chess Championships she has won gold (1974) and silver (1971) medals.

Johanna Tuomainen played for Finland in the Women's Chess Olympiads:
 In 1972, at second board in the 5th Chess Olympiad (women) in Skopje (+1, =1, -5),
 In 1974, at first board in the 6th Chess Olympiad (women) in Medellín (+1, =2, -5).

Johanna Tuomainen played for Finland in the Nordic Chess Cups:
 In 1974, at sixth board in the 5th Nordic Chess Cup in Eckernförde (+0, =2, -3),
 In 1975, at fifth board in the 6th Nordic Chess Cup in Hindås (+0, =2, -3) and won team bronze medal.

References

External links

Johanna Tuomainen chess games at 365chess.com

Year of birth missing
Year of death missing
Finnish chess players
Chess Olympiad competitors
20th-century chess players